Pseudanthias regalis is a species of marine ray-finned fish in the subfamily Anthiinae of the family Serranidae, the groupers and sea basses. It is endemic to French Polynesia.

References

regalis
Fauna of French Polynesia
Taxonomy articles created by Polbot
Taxa named by John Ernest Randall
Taxa named by Roger Lubbock
Fish described in 1981
Taxobox binomials not recognized by IUCN